Ipernity is a non-commercial photo sharing community which is financed exclusively by membership dues without any intention of making a profit. By means of the Ipernity Members Association (IMA), the community operates its own website for the protected private exchange of digital content such as photos, videos, audio files and blogs, as well as for the worldwide publication of selected content.

Within its groups, ipernity promotes the mutual inspiration and cross-border communication supported by a machine-aided translation. Since ipernity's web service is 100% members-owned, it is unaffected by external interests, especially those of investors. It is exclusively geared to the needs of the community. The privacy and contents of users are particularly protected at ipernity. Only those contents that are expressly approved for publication by the users appear in the results of search engines. Private data and content will in no way be analysed, passed on or sold for commercial purposes.

The website is in direct competition with Flickr and is therefore readily compared with it.  However, it stands out due to a slightly larger range of functions. According to the portal trusted.de, ipernity's service is among the seven best photo sharing services.

Origins

Ipernity originated in 2005, when the two French programmers Christophe Ruelle and Christian Conti set about programming a photo sharing platform. A first test version was put into operation in 2006, followed by the public beta version in 2007.   In December 2008, ipernity proved to be the best photo sharing platform at the second annual Open Web Awards by Mashable. The name of the website consists of "IP" and "eternity". In order to finance further development, the website was listed on the Paris Stock Exchange in July 2009. This resulted in a relaunch in April 2013, which was largely oriented towards the functions of Flickr at that time and went into competition with them. Shortly thereafter, Flickr changed its layout, which prompted many of its users to move to ipernity. Ipernity also benefited from the demise of the photo sharing service Panoramio between 2014 and 2016.

Planned shutdown of the site end of January 2017

At the end of 2016, the former operating company Ipernity S.A. informed users to have to discontinue the service on January 31, 2017 for economic reasons. Dedicated users then took the initiative to continue the website on their own. They negotiated a moratorium with Ipernity S.A. in order to consider various options for its continued existence.

Ongoing operation of the website by the members

On January 10, 2017, the idea was born to found a non-profit organization - the Ipernity Members Association (ima) - in order to continue to operate the website on their own initiative. This idea was communicated to users on January 26, 2017. At the same time, a survey was conducted to determine to what extent users would support such an operator model financially. The response was overwhelmingly positive. Within 15 days, 117% of the planned funds ($25,000) that were necessary for the continued operation of the website were collected via crowdfunding.

After the founding of the Ipernity Members Association (ima) on February 20, 2017, an asset deal was negotiated with Ipernity S.A. and fixed contractually in May 2017. Since September 1, 2017, the website has been operated independently by the community. The last liabilities from the asset deal were repaid at the end of January 2018. At the same time, an external IT service provider was commissioned to maintain the software and adapt it to new requirements.

In December 2018, after an announcement on October 26, Ipernity deleted 5.8 million files, for a total of 14.6 TB, from free accounts which went over the storage limits and therefore had "invisible content". The deleted content amounted to almost half of the total hosted by the service and left 18,000 free users and 1300 members with some content.

Usage

As a high-performance application in the desktop arena, Ipernity focuses on photographers, enthusiasts, artists, writers and semi-professional users. The community enables the exchange of images, videos, audio files and blogs, as well as the associated communication and global online publishing, with the aim of promoting dialogue and mutual inspiration. A mobile version of the site is also available with a limited range of functions.
Other apps for Ipernity are also available.

Features

Ipernity offers its users four different account levels, ranging from a free of charge Guest account with limited features and storage, to a Plus account that includes the full range of features and unlimited storage space. In addition to the uploading of images with titles, captions and metadata information, features include posting and receiving comments, use of an internal mailbox, options for customising one’s page layout, geo-mapping, embedding of notes and pictures, publication of articles or blogs, uploading of videos and audio files, editing and replacing of one’s own photos, downloading (depending on the permission granted by the copyright owner), participation in and establishment of thematic groups, and use of an integrated automatic translation feature that provides translations to and from eleven different languages, including English, French, German, Spanish, Italian, Dutch, Portuguese, Polish, Russian, Japanese and Chinese. This last feature allows for greater ease of communication between members at the international level and has attracted to Ipernity users from different countries the world over. In addition, the community’s internal newsletter, communications to members, and all how-to articles are consistently provided in all of its three main languages (English, German and French), while the platform itself supports 7 languages.

Ipernity is primarily geared towards content sharing within the community and users have full control over how widely they wish to disperse a particular image, article or other content, as well as with what limitations. The web site is specifically designed to allow users to limit access to their content, as well as who can comment on their content, by category.  Categories include private use only, family, friends, contacts within the community, and everyone at large.  In deciding under what kind of licence one wishes to publish a specific content, the user may choose from a wide range of options, from all rights reserved to free use. These options allow users to tailor their Ipernity account to their specific sharing needs and to the degree of privacy and copyright protection they desire.

Because Ipernity's photo sharing service is managed by a democratically regulated members’ association, subscribing members not only use the platform for their exchanges, but also have the right to participate in the life of the association itself, electing the governing bodies, reviewing financial and activity reports, and taking part in the decisions concerning the development of the community. This means that, unlike users of commercial online photo exchange platforms, Ipernity members have a say on any changes of direction, modification of policies, and the planning of future developments.

Due to its associative and strictly non-commercial nature, Ipernity depends on maintaining a viable membership and is reported by members to be very attentive to requests for assistance for technical problems and receptive to members’ suggestions. The community also takes advantage of volunteer work on the part of the members, who typically offer their services as administrators of one or more of the many thematic groups, but may also volunteer their help in other ways such as serving as advisors to the IMA, helping other members with photo projects and even sponsoring other users who cannot afford the membership fees. Ipernity also provides a space for developers.

Since the platform is financed entirely through membership fees and donations, there are no advertisements.

References

External links
 www.ipernity.com
 ima Bylaws

Further reading
 Alternativen zu Flickr - die Top 5 - Alternatives to Flickr! - the top 5

Image-sharing websites
Video hosting
Blog hosting services
Photography websites